Manyana is a village located in the Southern District of Botswana. It had   3,550 inhabitants at the 2011 census.

Settlements
Manyana is divided into 16 settlements:
Bikwane
Bikwe, 232 inhabitants
Boswelakgosi, 1 inhabitant
Dialane, 19 inhabitants
Fikeng, 8 inhabitants
Lekgorapana
Makokwe, 12 inhabitants
Manyelanong, 30 inhabitants
Matshai
Mokata
Phogotlhwe, 7 inhabitants
Ramating, 1 inhabitant
Ratlhogwana, 20 inhabitants
Sekgweng
Serowe, 1 inhabitant
Thakadiawa, 4 inhabitants

See also
 List of cities in Botswana

References

Populated places in Botswana